Poland competed at the 1994 European Athletics Championships in Helsinki, Finland, from 9-14 August 1994. A delegation of 37 athletes were sent to represent the country.

Medals

References

European Athletics Championships
1994
Nations at the 1994 European Athletics Championships